This was the first edition of the tournament.

Olivier Rochus won the final 6–2, 6–3 against Stéphane Robert.

Seeds

Draw

Finals

Top half

Bottom half

References
 Main Draw

Orange Open Guadeloupe - Singles
2011 Singles